Yannick Macoa (born May 17, 1984) is a Mauritian international footballer who plays as a goalkeeper for Pointe-aux-Sables Mates. As of May 2011, he has won 40 caps for the Mauritius national football team.

References

1984 births
Living people
Mauritian footballers
Mauritius international footballers
Mauritian Premier League players
AS Port-Louis 2000 players
Curepipe Starlight SC players
Association football goalkeepers